Graham's stonebasher (Hippopotamyrus grahami) is a species of ray-finned fish in the family Mormyridae. It is found in Kenya, Rwanda, Tanzania, and Uganda. Its natural habitats are rivers, swamps, freshwater lakes, freshwater marshes, and inland deltas. It is threatened by habitat loss.

References

Mormyridae
Taxonomy articles created by Polbot
Fish described in 1928